Vulcan is the debut extended play by American industrial rock band Snake River Conspiracy. It was released on October 5, 1999. The five-song EP contains three renditions of the title track, along with a B-side and a cover of the Beatles song "She Said She Said." The song Vulcan was also included on the band's debut album, Sonic Jihad, which came out in July 2000.

Reception 
In a positive review from NME, Steven Wells described Vulcan as "Y2K Tourette’s Pop" and named it as the "Single of the Week", writing that "[I]t beats the living shit out every single other record released this week and then dances naked around a bonfire of their burning corpses daubed in satanic runes and gibbering like a traumatised gibbon."

Track listing

References

1999 EPs
Albums produced by David Kahne
Albums produced by Jason Slater
Albums produced by Eric Valentine
Snake River Conspiracy albums
Reprise Records EPs